Dave Souter (30 March 1940 – 11 March 2020) was a Scottish professional footballer.

References

1940 births
2020 deaths
Footballers from Dundee
Scottish footballers
Association football fullbacks
Association football wingers
Scottish Football League players
Carnoustie Panmure F.C. players
Dundee United F.C. players
Arbroath F.C. players
Berwick Rangers F.C. players
East Fife F.C. players
Clyde F.C. players
Dundee F.C. players
Arbroath Victoria F.C. players